Tetragnatha guatemalensis, the Guatemalan long-jawed spider, is a species of long-jawed orb weaver in the family Tetragnathidae. It is found in North, Central America, Cuba, and Jamaica.

References

Tetragnathidae
Articles created by Qbugbot
Spiders described in 1889